The 2000 Eisenhower Trophy took place 31 August to 3 September on the Nick Faldo and Arnold Palmer courses at Sporting Club Berlin in Bad Saarow, Germany. It was the 22nd World Amateur Team Championship for the Eisenhower Trophy. The tournament was a 72-hole stroke play team event with 59 four-man teams. The best three scores for each round counted towards the team total. Each team played two rounds on the two courses. The leading teams played on the Arnold Palmer course on the third day and on the Nick Faldo course on the final day.

United States won the Eisenhower Trophy for the 11th time, finishing 16 strokes ahead of the silver medalists, Great Britain and Ireland. Australia took the bronze medal with Sweden in fourth place. Bryce Molder had the lowest individual score, 15-under-par 273, four strokes better than Paul Casey.

This was the last World Amateur Team Championship with teams of four; subsequent championships had teams of three with the best two scores for each round counting. It was also the last time that there was a Great Britain and Ireland team. From 2002, England, Scotland, Wales, and Ireland (a combined Republic of Ireland and Northern Ireland team) competed as separate teams.

Teams
59 four-man teams contested the event.

The following table lists the players on the leading teams.

Scores

Source:

Individual leaders
There was no official recognition for the lowest individual scores.

Source:

References

External links
Record Book on International Golf Federation website

Eisenhower Trophy
Golf tournaments in Germany
Eisenhower Trophy
Eisenhower Trophy
Eisenhower Trophy
Eisenhower Trophy